Marinomonas pollencensis is a Gram-negative and aerobic bacterium from the genus of Marinomonas which has been isolated from the seagrass Posidonia oceanica.

References

External links
Type strain of Marinomonas pollencensis at BacDive -  the Bacterial Diversity Metadatabase

Oceanospirillales
Bacteria described in 2010